Travessia (English title: The Path) is a Brazilian telenovela created by Glória Perez. It is produced and broadcast by TV Globo, and premiered on 10 October 2022. The telenovela follows the story of Brisa (Lucy Alves), who sees her life turned upside down when she is the victim of a deepfake. Rômulo Estrela, and Chay Suede also star.

Cast 
 Lucy Alves as Brisa Ribeiro
 Mariah Yohana as child Brisa
 Rômulo Estrela as Oto
 Chay Suede as Ariovaldo "Ari" Fernandes de Souza
 João Bravo as child Ari
 Drica Moraes as Núbia Fernandes
 Giovanna Antonelli as Heloísa "Helô" Sampaio Viana
 Alessandra Negrini as Guida Sampaio
 Vanessa Giácomo as Leonor "Leo" Sampaio
 Rodrigo Lombardi as André Moretti
 Alexandre Nero as Stênio Alencar
 Cássia Kis as Cidália Bastos
 Humberto Martins as Jorge Luiz Guerra
 Jade Picon as Chiara Rossi Guerra 
 Dandara Mariana as Talita
 Marcos Caruso as Dante
 Luci Pereira as Creusa "Creuzita" Macedo Matos
 Ana Lúcia Torre as Maria Luiza Sampaio "Cotinha"
 Noémia Costa as Inácia
 Otávio Müller
 Indira Nascimento as Laís
 Aílton Graça as Monteiro
 Guilherme Cabral as Rudá Sampaio 
 Rafael Losso as Gil
 Renata Tobelem as Dina
 Camila Rocha as Tininha
 Gabriely Mota as child Tininha
 Yohama Eshima as Yone
 Nathalia Falcão as Júlia
 Dudha Moreira as Cema
 Danielle Olimpia
 Priscila Vilela as Adalgisa 
 Aoxi as Silene
 Flávia Reis
 Bel Kutner as Lídia 
 Raul Gazolla as Van Damme
 Nando Cunha as Joel
 Orã Figueiredo as Nunes
 Leona Santos as Belle
 Iago Pires as Espeto
 Duda Santos as Isa
 Mariana Consoli
 Aliny Ulbricht
 Marcos Holanda
 João Cunha
 Rafael Telles
 Vicente Alvite as Tonho

Guest stars 
 Grazi Massafera as Débora Bittencourt
 Simão Fumega 
 Viviane de Assis

Production 
Travessia was initially scheduled to premiere in 2023, replacing Todas as Flores in the 9pm time-slot, however, it was later announced that Todas as Flores would be released on the Globoplay streaming service and Travessia would premiere following Pantanal. Filming of the telenovela began on 4 July 2022. The first teaser was shown on 5 September 2022.

Ratings

References

External links 
 

TV Globo telenovelas
Brazilian telenovelas
Portuguese-language telenovelas
2020s Brazilian television series
2022 Brazilian television series debuts
2022 telenovelas
Telenovelas by Glória Perez
Deepfakes
Works about computer hacking